Murat Eriş (born May 23, 1977 in Istanbul, Turkey) is a male Turkish table tennis player. He has been playing for Fenerbahçe TT since 2006 and also played for Ted Yeşilyurt and Sarkuysan in Turkey.

Major achievements
1 time Turkish Champion
3 time Turkish Super League Champion
1 time ETTU Cup Runner-up

References

External links
Player profile on fenerbahce.org
Team page on fenerbahce.org

1977 births
Living people
Sportspeople from Istanbul
Turkish male table tennis players
Fenerbahçe table tennis players